The Santa Cruz Challenger is a professional tennis tournament played on clay courts. It is currently part of the ATP Challenger Tour. It was part of the 2021 Legión Sudamericana but was temporarily suspended due to COVID-19. It is held annually at the Club de Tenis Santa Cruz in Santa Cruz de la Sierra, Bolivia since 2022 as part of the Legión Sudamericana.

Past finals

Singles

Doubles

References

ATP Challenger Tour
Clay court tennis tournaments
Tennis tournaments in Bolivia